Manfred ("Manni") Germar (born 10 March 1935 in Cologne) is a West German athlete who mainly competed in sprint events.

He competed for the United Team of Germany in the 1956 Summer Olympics held in Melbourne, Australia where he won the bronze medal in the 4 x 100 metre relay with his teammates Lothar Knörzer, Leonhard Pohl and Heinz Fütterer. In September 1957 he set a European record for 200m in Hannover.

References

European Championships

1935 births
Living people
German male sprinters
World record setters in athletics (track and field)
Olympic bronze medalists for the United Team of Germany
Olympic athletes of the United Team of Germany
Athletes (track and field) at the 1956 Summer Olympics
Athletes (track and field) at the 1960 Summer Olympics
Athletes from Cologne
European Athletics Championships medalists
Medalists at the 1956 Summer Olympics
Olympic bronze medalists in athletics (track and field)
Officers Crosses of the Order of Merit of the Federal Republic of Germany
ASV Köln athletes
German sports executives and administrators